Grosh is a surname of several possible origins.  It may be an Americanized spellings of surnames of Slavic and Germanic surnames derived from nicknames meaning "groschen". As such it may be either an occupational surname of a moneyer, money lender or money changer, or a nickname of a wealthy or greedy person. It may also be derived from the Ukrainian surname Groshok or Russian surname Notable people with this surname include:

Aaron B. Grosh
John Grosh
Richard J. Grosh

See also

Grosz (surname)

References

Polish-language surnames
East Slavic-language surnames
Jewish surnames